Elihu Brintnal Frost (May 12, 1860 – August 22, 1925) was an American lawyer with an early involvement in the submarine industry.

Born in Peekskill, New York, Frost was the son of lawyer Calvin Frost and Mary Antoinette Oppie (Hait) Frost.  He attended Peekskill Military Academy and graduated from Yale University in 1883, where he was a member of Skull and Bones.  He studied at Columbia Law School and initially worked for Lord Day & Lord.

In 1893 the United States Congress funded a $200,000 prize for submarine construction, and Frost lent John Philip Holland the funds he needed to participate in this prize contest; Frost and Holland were finally awarded the prize money in 1895. Frost became secretary-treasurer and later president of Holland's firm, which was first named the John P. Holland Torpedo Boat Company and later the Holland Submarine Company. When Isaac Rice formed the Electric Boat Company (the predecessor of General Dynamics) to build Holland's submarine designs, Frost became the company's vice-president, secretary, and chief financial officer.

Prominently reported in the newspapers of the time, Frost married and divorced twice.
When he died of paresis in Beach Bluff, Massachusetts, he left his estate to a female friend (later determined to be his fiancée), cutting off his relatives.

References

External links
Biography on U.S. Navy web site
"Morris view of Holland more widely accepted in our era" Electric Boat/General Dynamics web site
 Elihu B. Frost's role with John P. Holland's company is acknowledged at this site. Look under people & places/Elihu B. Frost.

1925 deaths
Yale University alumni 
Submarine pioneers
1860 births
American chief financial officers
Columbia Law School alumni
19th-century American lawyers